Dodds Park is located in northwestern Champaign, Illinois near Parkland College. This  park (roughly one fifth of the total Park District holdings) is noted for the "Tribute to Olympic Athletes Monument" on its grounds. The park was purchased in 1969 for the sum of $298,495.

Facilities
The park has 7 lighted baseball fields and 12 soccer fields on its grounds. Additionally, it features a small playground and picnic tables.

Champaign County Workers' Memorial

The memorial was dedicated on Labor Day September 2, 2002, and serves as a memorial to those workers who had lost their lives while working on the job. The memorial consists of two tablets which bear the names of those who have died working in Champaign County.

Tribute to Olympic athletes
The "Tribute to Olympic Athletes" was created to honor those residents of Champaign County who have competed in the Olympics. To date 41 athletes are commemorated on the monument since the tribute's dedication on July 4, 1991. The monument consists of several rising plateaus forming a walkway leading to a large granite gateway. Beyond the gateway a pedestal overlooking the playing fields in Dodds Park is inscribed with the names of those who have represented Champaign County in the Olympics.

Notable Olympic athletes

 Jean Driscoll, Wheelchair racing, 5x , 3x , 4x , 2000 Sydney, 1996 Atlanta, 1992 Barcelona, 1988 Seoul 
 Nichole Millage, Paralympic volleyball, 2x , 2012 London, 2008 Beijing
 Tyler McGill, 4 × 100 m medley, 2012 London 
 Robert Espeseth, Rowing, 1976 Montreal, 1980 Moscow, 1984 Los Angeles, 1988 Seoul
 Gia Lewis-Smallwood, Discus, 2012 London
 Karen Brems-Kurreck, Cycling, 2000 Sydney
 Dwight "Dike" Eddleman, High Jump, 1948 London

References

Champaign, Illinois
Labor monuments and memorials
Parks in Illinois
Protected areas of Champaign County, Illinois
1969 establishments in Illinois
Protected areas established in 1969
Sports in Champaign–Urbana, Illinois